The Junta of Commanders of the Armed Forces (1981) was a military junta which ruled Bolivia from August 4, 1981, through September 4, 1981 and consisted of Commander of the Bolivian Air Force, General Waldo Bernal Pereira; General of the Bolivian Army, Celso Torrelio; and Óscar Jaime Pammo, a Rear Admiral in the Bolivian Navy. This junta was preceded by President Luis García Meza Tejada.

This junta was dissolved with Celso Torrelio becoming de facto President of Bolivia until July 21, 1982.

Resources

See also
 Government of the Junta of Commanders of the Armed Forces, 1981

Political history of Bolivia
Military history of Bolivia